Exsula is a genus of moths of the family Noctuidae.

Species
 Exsula burmaensis Strand, 1912
 Exsula dentatrix Westwood, 1848
 Exsula victrix Westwood, 1848

References
 Exsula at Markku Savela's Lepidoptera and Some Other Life Forms
 Natural History Museum Lepidoptera genus database

Agaristinae